The Country House is a restaurant located at 241 W. 55th St. in Clarendon Hills, Illinois. It is known for casual dining, long-standing history, and the “Best Burger” of 2016 as voted by West Suburban Living’s yearly “Best of the West”.

History 
The restaurant was opened in 1922 by Emil Kobal. The two-story building served two purposes. The bottom floor was opened as a tavern and small grocery store, whereas the top floor served as his family's home. In the times of prohibition, The Country House remained open to the public, and is rumored to have still served alcoholic beverages to local regulars.

The Country House has changed hands twice since its opening. In 1957, Richard Montanelli bought the business for his mother, but it suffered under her declining health. 4 area residents purchased The Country House from Montanelli in 1974, and it underwent extensive renovations under their ownership, including the introduction of a new menu. Their now "famous" burger was featured on this menu. One by one, 3 of the original owners, including his brother and former majority owner Patrick Regnery, sold their shares to the remaining partner. By 1989, David Regnery retained sole ownership.  

In 1985, a second Country House was opened in Lisle, Illinois.

In 1996, a third Country House was opened in Geneva, Illinois.

Several locations were tried in Lisle but it has since closed.  Only the original location has remained profitable, likely due to the fact that it was run by more than just David.

David Regnery died in 2009 and Patrick returned to run it, as the only other remaining sibling has no restaurant experience.

Ghost story 

a young woman who showed up one day visibly distraught and asked
if she could leave her child there for a short while. She had been dating the bartender at the time. When the bartender refused, she took her child and sped off down 55th Street. About a half mile away she struck a tree in an apparent suicide.  While the baby survived, she died and is purported to be the ghost that haunts the Country House to this day.

References

https://www.burgerone.com/ghost-story/

Restaurants in Illinois
Restaurants established in 1922